Mexico's most popular sport is football (called fútbol in Mexico). , the top tier leagues in Mexico are Liga MX for the men and the Liga MX Femenil for women.

In Mexico, football became a professional men's sport in 1943. Since then, Mexico's most successful men's club has been Club América, with thirteen Liga MX titles.

The first women's professional football league in Mexico was established from the 2017–18 Liga MX Femenil season. It set new world records for attendances at women's professional football matches.

Antonio Carbajal was the first player to appear in five World Cups, and Hugo Sánchez was named best CONCACAF player of the 20th century by IFFHS.

Mexico's largest capacity stadiums are Estadio Azteca, Estadio Olímpico Universitario and Estadio Jalisco. , it was estimated that there were in the nation over 324,000 registered players and approximately 8,155,000 unregistered players.

Professional clubs

Men's football has been played professionally in Mexico since the early 1900s, inaugurated by club C.F. Pachuca. The first women's professional football league Liga MX Femenil was announced in December 2016 and the inaugural season started the following year. The development of women's football has occurred in waves since the 1950s.

Since 1996, the country has played two split seasons (Apertura and Clausura) instead of a traditional long season. This system is common throughout Latin America. There are two separate playoff and league divisions. After many years of calling the regular seasons as "Verano" (Summer) and "Invierno" (Winter); Liga MX (historically Primera División de México, Mexico First League Division) changed the names of the competition, and opted for a traditional name of Apertura and Clausura (opening and closing). The Apertura division begins in the middle of Mexico's summer and ends before the official start of winter. The Clausura division begins during the New Year, and concludes in the spring season.

Mexico's men's football has four tiers of clubs in the following order of level of competition: Liga MX, Liga de Expansión MX, Segunda División de México, and Liga TDP. Promotion and relegation are used by the Mexican Football Federation (FMF) to advance (promote) a lesser tier club into competition of like quality their aggregate percentage score warrants play in a higher competition tier. They replace the club that is demoted (relegated) to the next lower tier level based on their aggregate. Promotion and relegation take place after the Clausura season has ended.

Mexico's most successful men's clubs have been América with 13 Liga MX championships, Guadalajara with 12, Toluca with 10, Cruz Azul with 9, and León with 8. , Tigres UANL (women) are the most successful club on the women's side, winning three championships since the inaugural season of Liga MX Femenil. Both championship matches in the first season set new world records for attendance at a women's football league match with 32,466 fans in attendance at the Apertura final and 51,211 at the Clausura final match.

Association Football teams by City/Metro Area 

Liga MX is the most important and highest level league in Association Football. Liga de Expansión MX (formerly Ascenso MX) is Mexico's second division in Football. The following table shows the teams of these leagues and the cites/metro areas they're based in.

Key to colors and symbols

National teams

The Mexico men's national team has appeared in sixteen FIFA World Cups, reaching the quarter-finals twice (both times as hosts) and finishing in the round of 16 at seven consecutive tournaments. They also finished as runners-up at the Copa América twice. In 1999, Mexico beat Brazil 4–3 to win the FIFA Confederations Cup as hosts. Mexico won the title at the 2005 FIFA U-17 World Championship in Peru, and won the title at the 2011 FIFA U-17 World Cup in Mexico. The team were gold medalists at the 2012 Summer Olympics in London.

Players from Mexico have joined teams in Europe, including Jared Borgetti, Rafael Márquez, Gerardo Torrado, Cuauhtémoc Blanco, Nery Castillo, Carlos Salcido, Ricardo Osorio, Pável Pardo, Andrés Guardado, Guillermo Franco, Carlos Vela, Giovani dos Santos, Omar Bravo, Aaron Galindo, Héctor Moreno, Francisco Javier Rodríguez, Francisco Fonseca, Javier Hernández (commonly referred to as "Chicharito"), Pablo Barrera, Efraín Juárez, Guillermo Ochoa, Jesús Corona, Héctor Herrera, Miguel Layún, Raúl Jiménez, Marco Fabián, Diego Reyes, Hirving Lozano, Edson Álvarez, Alexis Vega and Diego Lainez the most recents.

Mexico's men's national team have achieved other significant feats such as the most CONCACAF Championship / CONCACAF Gold Cup titles with 11. Mexico has hosted two FIFA World Cups, in 1970 and 1986. Estadio Azteca is the biggest stadium in the world to have hosted two World Cup finals and is one of the largest stadiums in the world. Mexico will co-host the 2026 FIFA World Cup along with Canada and the United States. Several matches will take place in Mexico City, Monterrey and Guadalajara.

The Mexico women's national football team was officially formed ahead of the 1999 FIFA Women's World Cup played in the United States. However, in 1970 an unofficial team Mexico finished third in an unofficial Women's World Cup held in Italy. In 1971, the team hosted an unofficial women's World Cup and reached the final, only to lose to Denmark 3–0. An estimated 110,000 people attended the final at Estadio Azteca.

History
It is believed that football was introduced to Mexico by emigrant miners from Cornwall, England at the end of the 19th century. In the early 1900s, football was used as a method to  "indoctrinate modern labor practices" such as teamwork and competition within a set of rules upon the Mexican workers. By 1902 a five-team league emerged with a strong English influence.

Many of the early football teams were affiliated with corporations.

+50,000-capacity Mexican football stadiums

See also
 Women's football in Mexico
 Mexican football league system

References